Daniel Thomas Frazer (November 20, 1921 – December 16, 2011) was an American actor, born in a West Side neighborhood (formerly known as Hell's Kitchen) of Manhattan in New York City.  He was probably best known for his role as Captain Frank McNeil, the former partner turned supervisor of Theo Kojak, Telly Savalas's character, in the 1970s TV police drama Kojak. His screen career started in 1950. Frazer served in the Special Services division of the United States Army during World War II, where he got exposure to theatrical writing and directing.

His TV appearances include The Phil Silvers Show, Car 54, Where Are You?, The Untouchables, Route 66, Blue Light, The F.B.I., Barney Miller, The Eddie Capra Mysteries, and Law & Order. His first film role was in 1963's Lilies of the Field, playing Father Murphy. In his later years, Frazer appeared as detective Dan McCloskey on the daytime soap As the World Turns.

He died of cardiac arrest on December 16, 2011, at his home in Manhattan.

Filmography 
 The Andy Griffith Show (1961) - Mr. Harmon
 Lilies of the Field (1963) - Father Murphy
 Lord Love a Duck (1966) - Honest Joe
 Counterpoint (1967) - Chaminant
 Take the Money and Run (1969) - Julius Epstein - The Psychiatrist
 ...tick...tick...tick... (1970) - Ira Jackson
 Bananas (1971) - Priest
 Fuzz (1972) - Lt. Amos Byrnes
 The Stoolie (1972) - Police Sgt. Alex Brogan
 Kojak  (1973-1978, TV Series) - Capt. Frank McNeil / Chief of Detectives (117 episodes)
 Cleopatra Jones (1973) - Crawford
 The Super Cops (1974) - Police Capt. Irving Krasna
 Breakout (1975) - U.S. Customs Agent (uncredited)
 The Waltons (1981 episode "The Move") - Col. Henry Brunson (Cindy Walton's father)
 Kojak: The Belarus File (1985, TV Movie) - Chief of Detectives Frank McNeil
 As the World Turns (1986–1996, TV Series) - Lt. McCloskey
 Saying Kaddish (1991) - Uncle Manny
 Flodders in America (1992) - President
 Deconstructing Harry (1997) - Janet's Dad
 The Kings of Brooklyn (2004) - Leo 
 Fireflies (2006) - Jack
 The Pack (2009) - Sol Epstein (final film role)

References

External links
 

1921 births
2011 deaths
Male actors from New York City
American male film actors
American male television actors